The Çöpler mine is one of the largest gold mines in Turkey and in the world, operated by the American Alacer Gold Corporation. The mine is located in Erzincan Province. The mine has estimated reserves of 6 million oz of gold.

Çöpler is an epithermal porphyry copper-gold deposit which forms part of the Middle Eocene Çöpler–Kabataş magmatic complex in central-eastern Turkey which formed on the north-eastern margin of the Tauride-Anatolide microcontinent.  The intrusive rocks at Çöpler were emplaced into Late Paleozoic-Mesozoic metamorphosed sedimentary rocks.  Dating of igneous rocks indicate a brief magmatic and hydrothermal history at Çöpler less than a million year long about 43.8–44.6 Ma.  The composition of magma indicate it was generated in a convergent margin.  Çöpler is, however, located to far away from the Maden–Helete arc and therefore must have formed in a back-arc setting, similar to that in the Bingham Canyon Mine, Utah.

References

Sources

 

Gold mines in Turkey
Erzincan Province